Balfour M. Mount,  (born 14 April 1939) is a Canadian physician, surgeon, and academic. He is considered the father of palliative care in North America.

Born in Ottawa, Ontario, he received his medical degree from Queen's University in 1963 and studied surgery and urology at McGill University. In January 1973, Dr. Mount, an urologic-cancer surgeon, was influenced by a discussion group of Elisabeth Kubler-Ross' book On Death and Dying to lead a study of the conditions at Montreal's Royal Victoria Hospital. After visiting Cicely Saunders' St. Christopher's Hospice, he helped to create a similar ward within the Royal Victoria Hospital in 1974 and coined the term "palliative care". He became the founding Director of the Royal Victoria Hospital Palliative Care Service, the Palliative Care McGill in 1990 and the McGill Programs in Integrated Whole Person Care in 1999. Dr. Mount is the Eric M. Flanders Emeritus Professor of Palliative Care at McGill University.

Honours
In 1985, he was made a Member of the Order of Canada in recognition for having "founded the first Palliative Care Service at Montreal's Royal Victoria Hospital". In 2003, he was promoted to Officer in recognition of being "the father of palliative care in North America". In 1988, he was made an Officer of the National Order of Quebec. He has been awarded honorary degrees from the University of Calgary, Queen's University, and Dalhousie University. In 2018 he was inducted into the Canadian Medical Hall of Fame.

References

1939 births
Living people
Canadian surgeons
Academic staff of McGill University
Officers of the National Order of Quebec
Officers of the Order of Canada
People from Ottawa
Queen's University at Kingston alumni
Palliative care